In Greek mythology, Hegesandra or Hegesandre was a Spartan princess as the daughter of King Amyclas and possibly Diomede, daughter of Lapithes. She was probably the sister of Argalus, Cynortes, Hyacinthus, Laodamia (or Leanira), Harpalus, Polyboea, and in other versions, of Daphne. 

Hegesandra married Argeius, son of King Pelops of Pisa. The couple had three sons: Melanion, Alector and Boethoos.

Notes

References 

 Apollodorus, The Library with an English Translation by Sir James George Frazer, F.B.A., F.R.S. in 2 Volumes, Cambridge, MA, Harvard University Press; London, William Heinemann Ltd. 1921. ISBN 0-674-99135-4. Online version at the Perseus Digital Library. Greek text available from the same website.
 Pausanias, Description of Greece with an English Translation by W.H.S. Jones, Litt.D., and H.A. Ormerod, M.A., in 4 Volumes. Cambridge, MA, Harvard University Press; London, William Heinemann Ltd. 1918. . Online version at the Perseus Digital Library
 Pausanias, Graeciae Descriptio. 3 vols. Leipzig, Teubner. 1903.  Greek text available at the Perseus Digital Library.

Princesses in Greek mythology
Laconian characters in Greek mythology
Laconian mythology